In mathematics, the composition operator  with symbol  is a linear operator defined by the rule

where  denotes function composition.

The study of composition operators is covered by AMS category 47B33.

In physics
In physics, and especially the area of dynamical systems, the composition operator is usually referred to as the Koopman operator (and its wild surge in popularity is sometimes jokingly called "Koopmania"), named after Bernard Koopman. It is the left-adjoint of the transfer operator of Frobenius–Perron.

In Borel functional calculus
Using the language of category theory, the composition operator is a pull-back on the space of measurable functions; it is adjoint to the transfer operator in the same way that the pull-back is adjoint to the push-forward; the composition operator is the inverse image functor.

Since the domain considered here is that of Borel functions, the above describes the Koopman operator as it appears in Borel functional calculus.

In holomorphic functional calculus
The domain of a composition operator can be taken more narrowly, as some Banach space, often consisting of holomorphic functions: for example, some Hardy space or Bergman space. In this case, the composition operator lies in the realm of some functional calculus, such as the holomorphic functional calculus.

Interesting questions posed in the study of composition operators often relate to how the spectral properties of the operator depend on the function space.  Other questions include whether  is compact or trace-class; answers typically depend on how the function  behaves on the boundary of some domain.

When the transfer operator is a left-shift operator, the Koopman operator, as its adjoint, can be taken to be the right-shift operator. An appropriate basis, explicitly manifesting the shift, can often be found in the orthogonal polynomials. When these are orthogonal on the real number line, the shift is given by the Jacobi operator.  When the polynomials are orthogonal on some region of the complex plane (viz, in Bergman space), the Jacobi operator is replaced by a Hessenberg operator.

Applications
In mathematics, composition operators commonly occur in the study of shift operators, for example, in the Beurling–Lax theorem and the Wold decomposition. Shift operators can be studied as one-dimensional spin lattices.  Composition operators appear in the theory of Aleksandrov–Clark measures.

The eigenvalue equation of the composition operator is Schröder's equation, and the principal eigenfunction  is often called Schröder's function or Koenigs function. 

Composition operator has been used in data-driven techniques for dynamical systems by the use of dynamic mode decomposition algorithms, which approximate the modes and eigenvalues of the composition operator.

See also

 
 Carleman linearization
 
 
 
 Dynamic mode decomposition

References

 C. C. Cowen and B. D. MacCluer, Composition operators on spaces of analytic functions. Studies in Advanced Mathematics. CRC Press, Boca Raton, Florida, 1995. xii+388 pp. .
 J. H. Shapiro,  Composition operators and classical function theory. Universitext: Tracts in Mathematics. Springer-Verlag, New York, 1993. xvi+223 pp. .

Dynamical systems
Functional analysis
Operator theory
Topological vector spaces